Uff Yeh Mohabbat is a 1997 Hindi film directed by Vipin Handa and stars Twinkle Khanna and Abhishek Kapoor. It was unsuccessful at box office.

Cast
 Abhishek Kapoor as Raja
 Twinkle Khanna as Sonia Verma
 Anupam Kher as Tej Singh 
 Reema Lagoo as Raja's mother 
 Neena Gupta as Billo
 Sadiya Siddiqui as Chiclet
 Saeed Jaffrey as Viren Verma
 Gajendra Chouhan as Umang Usgaonkar
 Satyen Kappu as Principal Kapoor
 Shammi as Mrs. Usgaonkar

Production
The film's casting was announced in 1993 and it was promoted as a "love story in Sikkim". It was shot around the same time as Khanna's other films Barsaat (1995) and Jaan (1996) but had a delayed release.

Soundtrack
The music for "Uff Yeh Mohabbat" was composed by acclaimed music director duo Nikhil-Vinay. Some of the most popular tunes are "Utra na dil mein koi" and "Jab se hai seekha".

Reception

References

External links
 

1997 films
1990s Hindi-language films
Films scored by Anand–Milind
Films shot in Sikkim
Films scored by Nikhil-Vinay